Luis Alfonso Cruz (born February 10, 1984) is a Mexican professional baseball shortstop and third baseman for the Generales de Durango of the Mexican League and Naranjeros de Hermosillo of the Mexican Pacific League. He has previously played in Major League Baseball (MLB) with the Pittsburgh Pirates, Milwaukee Brewers, Los Angeles Dodgers and New York Yankees.

Professional career

Boston Red Sox
Cruz was originally signed by the Boston Red Sox as an amateur free agent on August 29, 2000. He played in the rookie leagues with the Gulf Coast Red Sox in 2001 and for 21 games in 2002 before he was promoted to the Class-A Augusta Greenjackets to finish the 2002 season. He hit .268 in 74 rookie league games and .188 with the Greenjackets.

San Diego Padres
On December 16, 2002 he was traded to the San Diego Padres for César Crespo. He played for the Padres organization through 2007, with the Fort Wayne Wizards (129 games in 2003), Lake Elsinore Storm (124 games in 2004), Mobile BayBears (44 games in 2005, 130 games in 2006), San Antonio Missions (69 games in 2007) and Portland Beavers (45 games in 2007). He also spent some time during that period with the Diablos Rojos del México in the Mexican League.

Pittsburgh Pirates
Cruz signed a minor league contract with the Pittsburgh Pirates for the 2008 season. After spending the majority of the year with the Double-A Altoona Curve and Triple-A Indianapolis Indians, he was called up to Pittsburgh and made his debut for the Pirates on September 2, 2008 against the Cincinnati Reds, recording a single to left field in his first Major League at-bat off of Aaron Harang. He had 15 hits in 67 at-bats for the Pirates in 2008, a .224 batting average.

Though he began the 2009 season on the Pirates major league roster, Cruz was reassigned to Triple-A in mid-April to make room for second baseman Delwyn Young, recently acquired from the Los Angeles Dodgers. He was recalled again on July 10. He appeared in a total of 27 games for the Pirates, hitting .214 and also played in 66 for Indianapolis, where he hit .253.

Milwaukee Brewers
After being claimed off waivers by the Milwaukee Brewers on December 7, 2009, Cruz played the entire 2010 season with the Triple-A Nashville Sounds (hitting .281 in 129 games) before being recalled by the Brewers on September 6, 2010. He appeared in only 7 games that September for the Brewers and hit .235.

During spring training 2011, Cruz was outrighted to Nashville but refused the assignment and opted for free agency on March 28.

Texas Rangers
He signed a minor league contract with the Texas Rangers on March 29, one day after his release by the Brewers. He played in 67 games for the AAA Round Rock Express, hitting .273 and also spent some more time on loan to the Mexican League.

Los Angeles Dodgers
Cruz signed a minor league contract with the Los Angeles Dodgers on November 20, 2011. After failing to make the Dodgers opening day roster, he was assigned to the AAA Albuquerque Isotopes, where he hit .318 and was selected to the Pacific Coast League mid-season All-Star team. He was called up to the Dodgers on July 2, 2012 when the Dodgers shortstop, Dee Gordon, was injured.  The following day he stole home after doubling in a game against the Cincinnati Reds.  He hit his first Major League home run on July 20 against Johan Santana of the New York Mets. Cruz remained in the starting lineup the rest of the season, first at shortstop and then switching over to third base when the Dodgers acquired Hanley Ramírez. Cruz's underdog success during 2012 led the home crowds at Dodger Stadium to chant "Cruuuuuz" when he came up to bat and the Dodgers began selling his replica jersey in the gift shop.  On the season, he played in 78 games and hit .297 with 6 home runs and 40 RBI.

Cruz began 2013 as the Dodgers starting third baseman but hit poorly and wound up as a seldom used utility infielder. In 45 games, he hit only .127 with 3 extra base hits. The Dodgers designated him for assignment and removed him from the 40 man roster on June 28. On July 2, he declined an assignment to AAA and became a free agent.

New York Yankees
On July 3, 2013, Cruz signed with the New York Yankees. He played in just 16 games for the Yankees, hitting .182 before he was placed on the disabled list with a knee sprain on July 24.  The Yankees designated him for assignment on August 16 and he was released on August 19, 2013.

Chiba Lotte Marines
He signed with the Chiba Lotte Marines in Japan's Nippon Professional Baseball for 2014. He would spend two years with the club, leading the team in home runs in 2014  with 16 and hitting 16 more in the 2015 season.

Yomiuri Giants
On December 11, 2015 Cruz signed a two-year deal with the Yomiuri Giants worth a total of four million dollars. In 2016 with the Giants, Cruz played in 81 games, batting .252 with 11 home runs and 37 RBIs. Cruz began with 2017 season with the Giants, appearing in 9 games with the club.

Tohoku Rakuten Golden Eagles
On July 26, 2017, Cruz's contract was purchased by the Tohoku Rakuten Golden Eagles of Nippon Professional Baseball. On December 2, 2017, he became a free agent.

Diablos Rojos del México
On February 1, 2018, Cruz signed with the Diablos Rojos del México of the Mexican Baseball League.

Toros de Tijuana
On July 9, 2018, Cruz signed with the Toros de Tijuana of the Mexican League for the 2019 season. Cruz did not play in a game in 2020 due to the cancellation of the Mexican League season because of the COVID-19 pandemic.

Generales de Durango
On March 3, 2022, Cruz was traded to the Generales de Durango of the Mexican League in exchange for future considerations. He decided not to play the 2022 season.

International career
He was selected Mexico national baseball team at 2006 World Baseball Classic, 2013 World Baseball Classic, 2017 World Baseball Classic and 2019 exhibition games against Japan.

References

External links

1984 births
Living people
Albuquerque Isotopes players
Altoona Curve players
Augusta GreenJackets players
Baseball players from Sonora
Chiba Lotte Marines players
Diablos Rojos del México players
Fort Wayne Wizards players
Gulf Coast Red Sox players
Indianapolis Indians players
Lake Elsinore Storm players
Los Angeles Dodgers players
Major League Baseball players from Mexico
Major League Baseball shortstops
Major League Baseball third basemen
Mayos de Navojoa players
Mexican expatriate baseball players in Japan
Mexican expatriate baseball players in the United States
Mexican League baseball center fielders
Mexican League baseball second basemen
Mexican League baseball shortstops
Mexican League baseball third basemen
Milwaukee Brewers players
Mobile BayBears players
Nashville Sounds players
New York Yankees players
Nippon Professional Baseball second basemen
Nippon Professional Baseball shortstops
Nippon Professional Baseball third basemen
People from Navojoa
Pittsburgh Pirates players
Portland Beavers players
Round Rock Express players
San Antonio Missions players
Tomateros de Culiacán players
Tohoku Rakuten Golden Eagles players
Toros de Tijuana players
Yomiuri Giants players
2006 World Baseball Classic players
2013 World Baseball Classic players
2017 World Baseball Classic players